Erick Sámano Alemán (born June 4, 1991, in Miguel Hidalgo, Mexico City), known as Erick Sámano, is a Mexican professional footballer who plays as a defender.

Sámano has played for Reboceros de La Piedad since 2016.

References

External links
Profile at Soccerway
 

Liga MX players
Living people
1991 births
Footballers from Mexico City
Mexican footballers
C.D. Veracruz footballers
Leones Negros UdeG footballers
Atlético San Luis footballers
La Piedad footballers
Association football defenders
Mexican beach soccer players
C.D. Guadalajara footballers
Atlético Capitalino players